Pavel Devátý  (born 17 June 1978 in Cheb) is a Czech footballer who plays for Pyhra.

He previously played for Chmel Blšany in the Czech Gambrinus liga.

References

1978 births
Living people
Czech footballers
Association football midfielders
Expatriate footballers in Slovakia
Czech expatriate sportspeople in Slovakia
Expatriate footballers in Germany
Czech expatriate sportspeople in Germany
People from Cheb
Czech First League players
FK Chmel Blšany players
FK Bohemians Prague (Střížkov) players
MŠK Žilina players
FC Spartak Trnava players
Slovak Super Liga players
1. FC Lokomotive Leipzig players
Sportspeople from the Karlovy Vary Region